This is a list of Billboard magazine's Top Hot 100 songs of 1988.

See also
1988 in music
List of Billboard Hot 100 number-one singles of 1988
List of Billboard Hot 100 top-ten singles in 1988

References

1988 record charts
Billboard charts